Ramdane Touhami (born 23 September 1974 in Montauban, France) is a French-Moroccan artist, creative director and entrepreneur.

Often called " a multi-disciplinary and polymath entrepreneur " by the international press, he has created different companies in the fashion, art, PR, and beauty industry since the early 90s.

He is also known for revamping the world's oldest wax manufacturer Cire Trudon.

Alongside his wife Victoire de Taillac, he is behind the 19th-century Parisian beauty brand, l’Officine Universelle Buly.

Early life 
Ramdane Touhami was born to a French Moroccan family of six in Montauban, a commune in the Occitanie region in southern France. At the age of 12, he was selected for an interview with the French President Chirac.

He spent his childhood in the countryside, and while he was still in school, he created his own T-shirt brand, Teuchiland, parodied Timberland with a reference to cannabis. He made a fortune out of it, but then was kidnapped and robbed of all the revenue. Then he dropped out of the boarding school, found himself on the wrong side of a Toulouse gang and escaped to Paris, where he was homeless for a year. He was stabbed and bears the scar to this day.

From there, he started his first concept store L’Epicerie in Paris, a trendy “park” where clothes, embodying the anti-Colette attitude, quickly gaining attention of the press such as Dazed & Confused, Herald Tribune, Le Monde, Vogue and The New York Times.

Career

Creative director 
Ramdane has worked as a creative director for various brands, helping fashion boutiques and luxury fragrances to revamp their stores and brand images.

He started by rebooting And A. in 2000, a fashion brand owned by the Japanese Group Sazaby, by reimagining interior of the store, the visual identity and marketing materials, purchasing, display, the creation of clothing collections, and even the musical selection. The journey continues later in 2003 when he was invited by Liberty, the famous London department store to renovate their men's sector, while he reconceived the entire line and merchandising, assembling 56 small trendy brands to create a walk-in chic closet for men's wear, followed by his new concept design in 2010 for Santa Eulalia Barcelona, realizing a " bar à eaux de cologne " (perfume bar) as a perfume palette.

One of his major revamping projects involves Cire Trudon, a historical French candle maker established in 1643, while it had been asleep for more than 350 years. To bring forth the lost history, he went back to the original name, reimagined the boutique, improved the original formula using vegetable wax, and created 20 perfumes for the line of scented candles, with each one having its own story that are often linked to the history of the brand or the larger one of France.

In June 2019, he established his own creative agency called Art Recherche Industrie, an art direction office in major aesthetic fields, distinguishing itself by "an original modus operandi: advocating home-made and zero-outsourcing". It works closely with his own beauty brand, Officine Universelle Buly, Buly 1803 in short, as well as other partners, such as Moncler.

Entrepreneur 
Despite his experience in art direction, Ramdane identifies himself more with "the logic of an entrepreneur". In 2003, he started his own tailor-made menswear brand R.T., for which he drew and developed his own fabrics and prints, followed by Résistance with a more urban style, honoring some of the most important historic and political icons. R.T. & Résistance has been sold in 180 retail stores around the world: " Maria Luisa " in Paris, " Nom de guerre " in New York City, " Isetan " in Tokyo, among others, and seen collaborations such as with the Black Panther Party for its 40th anniversary.

As his attention shifted from fashion to fragrances, Ramdane started his own scent studio Architecture Olfactive right after his work at Cire Trudon in 2010. The studio has designed numerous signature scents for various brands and companies, such as The Kooples in Paris, Barney's and the Mercer Hotel in New York, Santa Eulalia in Barcelona, as well as the Shangri-La hotels and palaces, together with imagination of scents for events.

In 2014, he established his own beauty brand Officine Universelle Buly at 6 rue Bonaparte in the 6th district in Paris with his wife, Victoire de Taillac-Touhami. The brand was initially founded by Jean-Vincent Bully in 1803, later revived by the duo, and now operates in several countries and regions selling a wide range of products including water-based perfumes, scented candles, etc.

Personal life 
Ramdane is married to Victoire de Taillac-Touhami, a beauty expert and ex-director of public relations for emblematic concept store Colette. They have been close partners since their meeting in the 90s, both romantically and professionally.

The couple now live in Paris, France, with their three children.

Glory 
In December 2020, Touhami was granted Chevalier des Arts et des Lettres (Knight of Arts and Letters).

Books and publications 
 2003: Participation at " Hello Kitty's 30th birthday " exhibit at Mori Museum, in Tokyo.
 2006: " View of the sea ", first movie directed with French graphic artist Artus de Lavilléon.
 2013: Launching of the independent beauty magazine " Corpus " alongside Victoire de Taillac. 
 2017: Publishing of:
 An Atlas of Natural Beauty (the U.K. edition), Ebury Press. (ISBN 978-1-785-03494-7) 
 Atlas de la beauté au naturel (French), edition originale Ebury Press. (ISBN 978-2-232-14494-3)
 2018: Publishing of:
An Atlas of Natural Beauty (the U.S. edition), Simon & Schuster. (ISBN 978-1-501-19735-2)
 2020: Launching of 
WAM Magazine, Ramdane Touhami's egocentric magazine, published by Art Recherche Industrie 
Атлас естественной красоты (Russia edition), Azbooka. (ISBN 978-5-389-16265-5)
 2021: Publishing of:
The Beauty of Time Travel, The Work of Ramdane Touhami and the Agency Art Recherche Industrie for Officine Universelle Buly, gestalten. (ISBN 978-3-96704-019-7)

References

External links

 Officine Universelle Buly official website 
 Art recherche industrie official website

1974 births
People from Montauban
Living people
French fashion designers
French artists
Moroccan contemporary artists
Moroccan fashion designers